Keith Daniel O'Neil (born August 26, 1980 in Rochester, Michigan) is a former American football linebacker in the National Football League for the Dallas Cowboys and Indianapolis Colts. He earned a Super Bowl ring with the Colts in Super Bowl XLI as they beat the Chicago Bears. He played college football at Northern Arizona.

Early years
O'Neil attended Sweet Home High School, where he played linebacker. As a senior, he received second-team All-state, All-conference and All-Western New York honors. He also ran track and played lacrosse.

He accepted a football scholarship from Northern Arizona University.

Professional career

Dallas Cowboys
O'Neil was signed as an undrafted free agent by the Dallas Cowboys after the 2003 NFL Draft. As a rookie, he registered 17 special teams tackles (second on the team).

In 2004, he remained a core special teams player (third on the team with 18 special teams) tackles and was the backup at weakside linebacker for Dexter Coakley.

On September 3, 2005, he was waived because the defense switched to a 3-4 alignment and he wasn't seen as a good fit for the new scheme.

Indianapolis Colts
O'Neil was claimed off waivers by the Indianapolis Colts on September 5, 2005. That year he registered 18 special teams tackles.

In 2006, he was inactive for 5 games with a high ankle sprain, he later suffered two fractured ribs and a sprained knee. He posted 14 special teams tackles and played in Super Bowl XLI. On July 30, 2007, he was placed on the Physically unable to perform list recovering from a sports hernia surgery. He suffered a chest injury in the second preseason game against the Chicago Bears. On August 26, he was placed on the injured reserve list and was eventually released.

New York Giants
On February 18, 2008, he was signed as a free agent by the New York Giants, after spending a year out of football. He decided to retire and was placed on the reserve/retired list on June 2.

Personal
O'Neil is the son of former NFL linebacker Ed O'Neil. O'Neil's brother Kevin, played football for Syracuse University. His brother-in-law Drew Haddad played wide receiver in the NFL.

References 

1980 births
Living people
People from Amherst, New York
Players of American football from New York (state)
Sportspeople from Erie County, New York
American football linebackers
Northern Arizona Lumberjacks football players
Dallas Cowboys players
Indianapolis Colts players
New York Giants players